Alejandro Juan Colla (born 26 December 1970) is an Argentine sailor. He competed in the Finn event at the 2004 Summer Olympics.

References

External links
 
 

1970 births
Living people
Argentine male sailors (sport)
Olympic sailors of Argentina
Sailors at the 2004 Summer Olympics – Finn
Sportspeople from Rosario, Santa Fe